St. Peter Parish - designated for Polish immigrants in Norwood, Massachusetts, United States.

 Founded 1918. It was one of the Polish-American Roman Catholic parishes in New England in the Archdiocese of Boston.

The parish closed August 3, 1997.

Bibliography 

 Our Lady of Czestochowa Parish - Centennial 1893-1993
 The Official Catholic Directory in USA

External links 
 Roman Catholic Archdiocese of Boston
 Closed and Merged Parishes

Roman Catholic parishes of Archdiocese of Boston
Polish-American Roman Catholic parishes in Massachusetts
Norwood, Massachusetts